Brigadier General Joseph Warren Stilwell Jr. (March 6, 1912 – July 25, 1966) was a United States Army general best known for his service in United States Army Special Forces and the United States Army Support Group in the Vietnam War.

Early life and education
Stilwell was born in Syracuse, New York, one of five children of General Joseph Stilwell. He attended West Point, graduating in the class of 1933. Stilwell later graduated from the Army and Navy Staff College in 1945 and the United States Army War College in 1951.

Military career
Stilwell served as a lieutenant with the 15th Infantry Regiment (United States) in China in 1937. During a troop movement from Chinwangtao to Tientsin on July 29, 1937, Stilwell's unit came into contact with a battle between Chinese and Japanese forces. Major William F. Lee, First Lieutenant Stilwell and four of their men each received the Soldier's Medal for protecting the unit and its equipment from injury and damage.

During World War II, Stilwell served in the China Burma India Theater, earning his first awards of the Legion of Merit and the Air Medal.

Stilwell served as commander of the 23rd Infantry Regiment, 2nd Infantry Division in Korea from 1952 to 1953, earning his second award of the Legion of Merit and first award of the Bronze Star Medal.

Stilwell served as commander of United States Army Support Group, Vietnam (renamed United States Army Support Command, Vietnam from March 1, 1964) from August 26, 1962, until June 30, 1964.

Death
Stilwell was lost at sea on July 25, 1966, when flying a C-47 to Hawaii with longtime friend and pilot Hal Grimes of Air Ferry International. Harold Fossum was the navigator. The C-47 was to continue on to Thailand; however, Stilwell was only intending to travel as far as Hawaii to increase his instrument rating qualification. The Coast Guard, USAF and US Navy (including three destroyers and the ) searched an area of 105,000 square miles without finding any trace of the aircraft. A memorial to Brig. Gen. Stilwell was erected at the West Point Cemetery next to the gravesite of his parents.

Awards and decorations

References

1912 births
1966 deaths
People from Syracuse, New York
United States Military Academy alumni
Recipients of the Soldier's Medal
United States Army personnel of World War II
Recipients of the Air Medal
Recipients of the Legion of Merit
Joint Forces Staff College alumni
United States Army War College alumni
United States Army personnel of the Korean War
United States Army generals
United States Army personnel of the Vietnam War
Recipients of the Distinguished Flying Cross (United States)
Recipients of the Distinguished Service Medal (US Army)
Victims of aviation accidents or incidents in international waters